= List of Olympic medalists in athletics (mixed) =

List of mixed Olympic medalists in athletics may refer to:

- Athletics at the 2020 Summer Olympics § Mixed
- Athletics at the 2024 Summer Olympics § Mixed events
